Barreca is an Italian surname. Notable people with the surname include:

Antonio Barreca (born 1995), Italian footballer
Gina Barreca (born 1957), American academic and humorist

Italian-language surnames